An aldonic acid is any of a family of sugar acids obtained by oxidation of the aldehyde functional group of an aldose to form a carboxylic acid functional group.  Thus, their general chemical formula is HOOC-(CHOH)n-CH2OH. Oxidation of the terminal hydroxyl group instead of the terminal aldehyde yields a uronic acid, while oxidation of both terminal ends yields an aldaric acid.

Aldonic acids are typically prepared by oxidation of the sugar with bromine.  They are generally found in their lactone form, with the ring structure essentially the same as in the original sugar's cyclic hemiacetal form, which is the form the sugar is usually found in.  However, unlike hemiacetals, lactones do not have a chiral anomeric carbon, and they cannot form glycosidic linkages.

Aldonic acids are found in many biological systems, and are the products of the oxidation of aldoses by Benedict's or Fehling's reagents.  Their lactones are key intermediates in the Kiliani-Fischer synthesis of sugars.

Nomenclature of aldonic acids and their lactones is based on replacing the suffix "-ose" with "onic acid" or "onolactone" respectively; hence D-glucose is oxidized to D-gluconic acid and D-gluconolactone.

References

Sugar acids